Shaadi.com is an Indian online wedding service founded in 1997. Its core market is India, Pakistan, and Bangladesh, but the company operates globally, with offices in Canada, the United Arab Emirates, the United Kingdom, and the United States.

Overview
Shaadi.com began as Sagaai.com in 1997. Its founder, Anupam Mittal, changed its name to Shaadi.com in 1999, believing it to be a more marketable name. Its initial success was primarily among non-resident Indians, as Internet adoption across India was poor at the time, and conservative parents were hesitant to arrange marriages through a new startup. Despite some early personnel troubles, Shaadi.com saw success over the next fifteen years as Internet adoption increased and people became more receptive to online matchmaking. By 2008, it had become the world's leading matrimonial website for Asians, and had twenty million users by 2011.

In addition to online matchmaking, Shaadi.com runs over one hundred Shaadi Centres, retail outlets that offer matrimony-related services. The first was opened in Mumbai in 2004.

In 2009 it collaborated with Star Plus to produce India's first marriage-based reality television show.

In 2012 Shaadi.com launched the Facebook game Angry Brides to bring awareness to dowry abuses in India.

In 2014, Shaadi.com launched Shaadi Cares, a social initiative to educate people regarding marital issues, including dowry and domestic violence.

In 2016, Shaadi.com acquired Thrill Group, a startup that included two dating products, Frivil and Fropper, founded by expat entrepreneurs Josh Israel and Devin Serago.

Recognition
 Business Today highlighted Shaadi.com as one of India's ten best marketers in 2007.
 Shaadi.com was chosen for The Best Hindu Matrimonial Website category in About.com's 2011 Readers' Choice Awards.
 Shaadi.com placed silver in the "Best Use of Ecommerce - Self (own) brands Product/ Services" category of the 2012 Indian Digital Media Awards.
 Angry Brides placed silver in the "Social Media - Best Use/Campaign on Social Network - Social Cause" category of the 2013 Indian Digital Media Awards.

See also 
 BharatMatrimony
 Jeevansathi.com
 Matrimony.com

References

External links
 

Indian matrimonial websites
Internet properties established in 1997